Carl Ludwig Alfred Franz Murdfield, also Karl Murdfield (9 June 1868 – 8 May 1944) was a German portrait and Interieurmaler of the Düsseldorf school of painting, director of the Kunsthalle Düsseldorf, Organiser of art exhibitions, archivist and chairman of the art association Malkasten, author of local and Art history anecdotes as well as City Councillor in Düsseldorf.

Life 

Born in Rheine, Murdfield, youngest of five children from the marriage of the Catholic merchant Theodor Carl Joseph Murdfield (1823-1904) to Magdalena "Lena", née Becker (1836-1910), grew up in Rheine and attended the Düsseldorf Art Academy from 1885 to 1892/1893. His teachers there were Heinrich Lauenstein, Hugo Crola, Johann Peter Theodor Janssen, Adolf Schill, Julius Roeting and Eduard Gerhardt. During this time he was a member of the student fraternity Tartarus. After his studies in Düsseldorf, he went to the Académie Julian in Paris.

In 1896, Murdfield settled in Düsseldorf. There he became a member, later archivist and chairman of the artists' association Malkasten, also a member of the Verein zur Veranstaltung von Kunstausstellungen and, as successor to Hermann Carl Hempel Director of the Kunsthalle. In these functions he organised art exhibitions alongside his work as a portrait painter. At the end of 1934 Murdfield retired as managing director of the Kunsthalle and was succeeded by the painter Fred Kocks. In addition, he was active for the Deutsche Zentrumspartei as a city councillor in the council of the city of Düsseldorf from 1919 to 1924. Among the personalities who commissioned Murdfield to paint portraits were Archbishop  and the former Lord Mayor of Düsseldorf .

On 19 April 1898, he married Bertha Offenberg (1874-1919), the daughter of the mountain councilor Ludwig Offenberg (1830-1879), who gave birth to their daughter Johanna. The painter Gisela Baur-Nütten (1886-1981), who married the painter Albert Baur the Younger around 1906, was a private student of Murdfield's in the 1900s.

Murdfield died in 1944 at the age of 75 after a short illness in Unterjoch (Allgäu), where he is buried in the mountain cemetery.

Publications 
 Malkasten-Anekdoten und Künstler-Erinnerungen. Schwann, Düsseldorf 1927.
 Aus der Chronika des „Malkasten“. In Velhagen & Klasings Monatshefte, 42. Jahrgang (1927/1928), vol. 1,  (PDF).
 Der Maler als Schmiedemeister. In Eifel-Kalender, Jahrgang 1931,  (Numerized, Anecdote about the genre painter Hubert Salentin).

References

Further reading 
 Murdfield, Carl. In Hans Vollmer (ed.): Allgemeines Lexikon der Bildenden Künstler von der Antike bis zur Gegenwart. Created by Ulrich Thieme and Felix Becker. Vol. 25: Moehring–Olivié. E. A. Seemann, Leipzig 1931, .
 Johanna Clostermann: Erinnerungen an meinen Vater, den Maler Carl Murfield (1868–1944). In Rheine, gestern, heute, morgen, 16th edition (1986), fascicule 1, .
 Christiane Kerrutt: Carl Murdfield (1868–1944). Ein Maler aus Rheine – Leben und Werk. In Rheine, gestern, heute, morgen, 47. Ausgabe (2001), fascicule 1, .
 Sabine Schroyen: In Erinnerung an den „lebenden Chronisten“. Carl Murdfield und der Düsseldorfer Künstlerverein Malkasten. In: Rheine, gestern, heute, morgen. 47th edition (2001), fascicule 1, .

External links 
 Carl Murdfield, Datenblatt im Portal rkd.nl (Netherlands Institute for Art History)
 Murdfield, Carl, Totenanzeige und biografische Angaben im Portal wgff-tz.de
 Karl Murdfield, genealogisches Datenblatt in portal genealogieonline.nl
 Carl Murdfield, Auktionsresultate im Portal artnet.de

19th-century German painters
19th-century German male artists
20th-century German painters
20th-century German male artists
German portrait painters
German curators
1868 births
1944 deaths
People from Rheine